Richburg is an unincorporated community in Coffee County, Alabama, United States.

History
A post office operated under the name Richburg from 1900 to 1913.

References

Unincorporated communities in Coffee County, Alabama
Unincorporated communities in Alabama